Malombra is a 1974 Italian television series. It is an adaptation of the 1881 gothic novel Malombra by Antonio Fogazzaro, which has also been made into several films. It aired on Rai 1 in four 60 minutes episodes.

Cast
 Giovanni Conforti as Giuseppe  
 Marina Malfatti as Marina di Malombra 
 Giulio Bosetti as Corrado Silla  
 Friedrich Joloff as Andreas G. Steinegge 
 Leda Palma as Fanny  
 Emilio Cigoli as  Conte Cesare d'Ormengo  
 Ezio Busso as  Il dottore  
 Dorit Henke as Edith Steinegge  
 Fausto Tommei as Professor Vezza 
 Luciano Virgilio as Nepomuceno Salvador 
 Miranda Campa as  Giovanna  
 Elsa Vazzoler as Contessa Fosca Salvador 
 Marina Bonfigli as Contessa Giulia di Bella 
 Toni Barpi as Momolo
 Emanuel Agostinelli as Rico 
 Winni Riva as Catte  
 Marcello Mandò as Ingegner Ferrieri  
 Mario Lombardini as  Don Innocenzo  
 Giovanni Moretti as Il vetturale  
 Enrico Osterman as Avvocato Mirovic  
 Gino Nelinti as L'editore  
 Ferruccio Casacci as Il tappezziere  
 Corrado Gaipa as Padre Tosi 
 Mauro Barbagli as  Onorevole Finotti  
 Franco Vaccaro as Il capostazione

References

Bibliography
 Enrico Lancia. Dizionario del cinema italiano: testi e strumenti per la scuola e l'università, Volume 1. Gremese Editore, 2003.

External links
 

1974 Italian television series debuts
1974 Italian television series endings
1970s Italian television series